Waunfawr (gwaun + mawr) is a village and community,  SE of Caernarfon, near the Snowdonia National Park, Gwynedd, in Wales.

Description
Waunfawr is in the Gwyrfai valley, on the A4085 road from Caernarfon to Beddgelert.

Waunfawr railway station on the Welsh Highland Railway between Caernarfon and Porthmadog adjoins the Snowdonia Park Brewpub and Campsite at the southern end of the village. The brewpub is a recent winner of the Campaign for Real Ale award for a number of its beers and voted best pub in the region for 2012; and has also won the CAMRA Gwynedd a Mon Pub of the Year, in 2012,13,14 & 15.

The name Waunfawr was previously spelled Waenfawr, a garbled version corrected by common consent in 1994 consistent with the aims of the Welsh Language Society to maintain the Welsh language in its proper form throughout public signage and usage.

The community had a population of 1,427 at the 2011 census. According to the United Kingdom Census 2011, the percentage of Welsh language speakers above age 3 was 79.5%. This was a 1.4% increase since the previous census in 2001.

The ward had a population of 1,676 at the 2011 census, and includes Caeathro nearer to Caernarfon. as does the community.

The local landscape reflects the village name, with the nearby mountains such as Mynydd Mawr and Moel Eilio, with views of Snowdon, the highest mountain in Wales, possible from some locations. There are a number of tourist locations for camping in Waunfawr and there is the opportunity to enjoy trekking and other Snowdonia National Park activities such as canoeing and mountain climbing.

Glan Gwna
Glan Gwna is a grade II* listed country house, which stands in the  Glan Gwna estate within the community of Waunfawr on the banks of the River Seiont. The estate is now the Glan Gwna Holiday Park.

In 1893 the estate was bought by the wealthy slate quarry owner John Ernest Greaves, who also owned Bron Eifion, near Criccieth. He knocked down the old hall and rebuilt it. On his death in 1945, Glan Gwna was left to his granddaughter Dorothy, who had married a cousin, William Flower of the brewing family, and the estate farms were subsequently sold. In the 1950s the estate was bought by a local businessman as a caravan park. During the 1970s, under new ownership, the estate became a holiday park, with 45 of the 200 acres ( of the ) dedicated to lodges, bungalows and cottages.

Local charities
The local social enterprise, Antur Waunfawr, which was created by R. Gwynn Davies, in 1984, among its many initiatives, has three sites, with the Bryn Pistyll site at Waunfawr housing the organisation's head office. This site has proved to be a popular attraction for local people and tourists alike, as it includes a seven-acre nature park, gardens, Blas y Waun café, a crafts shop and a children's play area. Antur provides work and training opportunities to adults with learning difficulties, and operates a green agenda, with their other sites (Warws Werdd and Caergylchu on the Cibyn Industrial Estate in Caernarfon) recycling everything from cardboard to curtains.

Historical landmarks
The Marconi Company built a large high-powered longwave wireless telegraph transmitting station on the hilltop above the village in 1914 which worked in association with its receiving station at Tywyn.  The station initiated commercial transatlantic wireless service from London to New York City in 1920. It replaced Marconi's transatlantic wireless service from Clifden, Ireland to Canada, after the Clifden station was destroyed in the Irish Civil War in 1922. The building was until recently used as a climbing centre called Beacon Climbing, which has since relocated to Caernarfon town.

There are many recreational facilities available in Waunfawr, from playing snooker to playing football on the all-weather pitch. There is also a youth club and a junior football club. The village has its own school teaching local children up to the age of 11, called Ysgol Waunfawr . The village has a number of interesting church buildings, some of them dating back over 150 years and possessing classic forms of masonry and architecture.

Notable people from Waunfawr 

 John Evans (1770–1799) was born in Waunfawr and produced an early map of the Missouri River in North America.
 Griffith Williams (1769–1838), a bardic pupil of Dafydd Ddu Eryri.
 Owen Williams (1790–1874), antiquary and the author of a Welsh dictionary.
 William Henry Preece (1834–1913), engineer, pioneer in the development of the telephone, mentor to Guglielmo Marconi
 Welsh language alternative rock band Big Leaves grew up in Waunfawr and formed the band under the name Beganifs in 1988 aged 11 and 12. Two members of Big Leaves went on to form the band Sibrydion.

Other information 
Waunfawr is also the name of a village which now forms a northern suburb of Aberystwyth.

References

Further reading 
 Hari Williams, Marconi and His Wireless Stations in Wales (Llanrwst: Carreg Gwalch, 1999).

External links 

Antur Waunfawr website
A Short History of the Marconi Long Wave Transmitting Station
Chamois Mountaineering Club
www.geograph.co.uk : photos of Waunfawr and surrounding area
Ysgol Waunfawr
Snowdonia Parc Brewpub & Campsite

 
Transatlantic telecommunications